FC Nõmme United is an Estonian football club based in Nõmme, a district in Tallinn. The club was founded in 2000. They currently play in the Esiliiga, the second-highest division in the Estonian football. Their home ground is Männiku staadion.

Led by Mart Poom, the club is renowned for its strong youth system.

History 
The club was founded in 2000 by Enn Loog and was initially named FC Elion, before the name was changed to FC Nõmme United in 2006. From early years on, Mart Poom, who at the time was playing in the Premier League, contributed to the growth of the club. After Poom's retirement, Mart Poomi Jalgpallikool was founded which started to act as an academy to Nõmme United. The club quickly established itself as one of the leading youth academies in the country. In 2018, goalkeeper Karl Jakob Hein joined the academy of Arsenal F.C. and made his first team debut on 9 November 2022, becoming the second Estonian to feature for the Gunners after club's president Mart Poom.

After finishing first in the Estonian third-tier Esiliiga B in 2019, the club was promoted to Esiliiga. After the 2022 season, Vladimir Vassiljev became the manager of the club and Nõmme United set their sights on gaining promotion to Premium Liiga within the next three seasons.

Stadium 
Nõmme United's home base is the Männiku Football Center, located at Võidu 16, Nõmme, Tallinn. The complex consists of one natural grass football pitch (104 × 64m) and one artificial turf football pitch (90 × 60m), upon which an air dome is installed during the winter months.

Opened in 2016, the sports center also facilitates a gym, sauna, cafeteria and a hotel.

Players

Current squad

 ''As of 7 March, 2022.

Personnel

Current technical staff

Managerial history

Statistics

League and Cup

References

External links
 Official website 

Association football clubs established in 2000
Football clubs in Tallinn
2000 establishments in Estonia